Charisse Jones (born October 14, 1966) is an American journalist and essayist.

Life
She was a staff writer for The New York Times and the Los Angeles Times, and commentator for National Public Radio. 
She is a national correspondent for USA Today, and is a contributing writer for Essence magazine. She has a son, Jordan Kinard.

Awards
 2004 American Book Award

Works

References

External links
"shifting website"

Living people
The New York Times writers
USA Today journalists
NPR personalities
21st-century American essayists
American women journalists
American women essayists
American Book Award winners
1966 births
21st-century American journalists
21st-century American women